Manujan (also Romanized as Manūjān; also known as Qal‘eh-ye Manūjān - meaning "Fort Manujan"; formerly, Posht Qalāt) is a city and capital of Manujan County, Kerman Province, Iran.  At the 2006 census, its population was 12,110, in 2,501 families.

References

Populated places in Manujan County

Cities in Kerman Province